Megorama is a genus of death-watch and spider beetles in the family Ptinidae. There are about five described species in Megorama.

Species
These five species belong to the genus Megorama:
 Megorama frontale (LeConte, 1878) i c g b
 Megorama ingens Fall, 1905 i c g b
 Megorama simplex (LeConte, 1865) i c g
 Megorama subserratum Israelson, 1974 g
 Megorama viduum Fall, 1905 i c g b
Data sources: i = ITIS, c = Catalogue of Life, g = GBIF, b = Bugguide.net

References

Ptinidae